= Groninger Courant =

Dutch newspaper

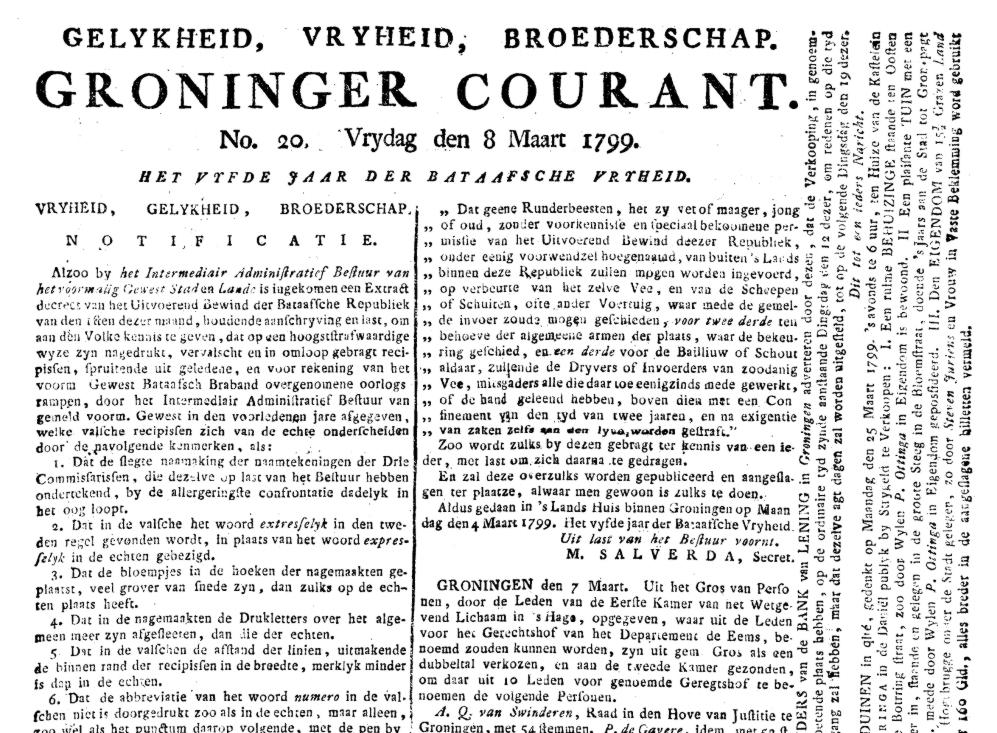
Groninger Courant newspaper from the 8th of March 1799

The Groninger Courant was a Dutch newspaper, published in the City of Groningen under four different titles, between 1743 and 1811. The newspaper contained four pages on one folded sheet.

== History ==
The newspaper appeared first in 1743 as the Geoctrojeerde Groninger Courant. Later that year it became the Opregte Nieuwe Groninger Courant. In 1748 it continued as the Opregte Groninger Courant.

On 16 July 1773 the paper became the Groninger Courant and was published as such until its publication was ceased on 1 July 1811. Subsequent publications that included the name "Groninger Courant" were no longer related to the original Groninger Courant.
